Lesnoye is a rural locality (a village) in Bryansky District, Bryansk Oblast, Russia. The population was 62 as of 2010. There is 1 street.

Geography 
Lesnoye is located 64 km east of Glinishchevo (the district's administrative centre) by road. Kozyolkino is the nearest rural locality.

References 

Rural localities in Bryansky District